Marek Minařík (born 28 June 1993) is a Czech professional baseball pitcher. He previously played for the Philadelphia Phillies and Pittsburgh Pirates organizations. He played for Team Czech Republic in the 2019 European Baseball Championship.

Career
Minařík played for the Gulf Coast League Phillies in 2011, going 0–0 with a 6.00 earned run average (ERA) in three inning pitched. In 2012, he went 1–0 with a 2.65 ERA in 17 innings. In 2014, pitching for two minor league teams of the Pittsburgh Pirates, he was a combined 1–6 with a 5.06 ERA. In 2015, pitching for the Bristol Pirates he was 2–6 with a 6.32 ERA.

International career
He was selected for the Czech Republic national baseball team at the 2012 European Baseball Championship, 2013 World Baseball Classic Qualification, 2014 European Baseball Championship,  2015 USA Tour, 2017 World Baseball Classic Qualification, and 2016 European Baseball Championship. He played for the team at the Africa/Europe 2020 Olympic Qualification tournament, in Italy in September 2019.

In 2022, Minařík was selected to play the 2023 World Baseball Classic qualification.

References

External links

1993 births
Living people
Baseball pitchers
Bristol Pirates players
Czech expatriate baseball players in the United States
Florida Complex League Phillies players
Jamestown Jammers players
People from Louny
Sportspeople from the Ústí nad Labem Region
2016 European Baseball Championship players
2019 European Baseball Championship players
2023 World Baseball Classic players